Net Daemons Associates (NDA) was a computer system and network administration company that "ran the wave" of the 1990s high tech bubble going from a $900.00 investment to multimillion-dollar revenue, getting purchased by Interliant Corporation right at the start of the economic downturn in 1999.

The company started as a partnership between Jennifer Lawton and Christopher Caldwell with help from Rudolph Ventresca. It was founded to take care of spin-offs from the bankrupt company Stardent in 1991 under the name NDI and incorporated in 1992 as Net Daemons Associates (aka NDA). The company grew to 60 people with offices in Massachusetts, California, Colorado, and Utah and $6 million in revenue by 1999. It became one of Deloitte and Touche's fast 50 and Inc. Magazine's fastest 500 growing corporations in 1997 and 1998.

It was acquired by Interliant, a "roll-up" corporation that went bankrupt in 2002. The consulting group of Interliant was acquired by Akibia Corporation in 2002–2003.

NDA's services included performing large scale network administration for UNIX, Linux, Windows and Mac networks; assisting companies in getting onto the Internet and setting up their websites; custom programming and network automation through scripting; security audits, penetration testing; and assisting companies in moving their computer networks.

References

1991 establishments in Massachusetts
1999 disestablishments in Massachusetts
1991 mergers and acquisitions
Computer companies established in 1991
Computer companies disestablished in 1999
Defunct computer companies of the United States
Defunct companies based in Massachusetts